Ice Age is a 1975 West German drama film directed by Peter Zadek. It was entered into the 25th Berlin International Film Festival. Eiszeit began as a theatre play by Tankred Dorst (1973) about Knut Hamsun, a Nobel Prize–winning author but unrepentant admirer of Nazi Germany.

Cast
 O. E. Hasse as Old Man
 Hannelore Hoger as Vera
 Walter Schmidinger as Paul
 Ulrich Wildgruber as Oswald Kronen
 Elisabeth Stepanek as Sonja
 Helmut Qualtinger as Fitler / Old Officer
 Rosel Zech as Wanda
 Heinz Bennent as Pastor Holm
 Hans Hirschmüller as Reich
 Hermann Lause as Director of Savings Bank
 Diether Krebs as Consultant
 Helmut Erfurth as Greengrocer
 Hans Mahnke as Kristian
 Hans Wehrl as Kristian
 Ernst Konarek as Cook (as Ernst Kmoarek)

References

External links

1975 films
1975 drama films
1970s German-language films
German drama films
West German films
Films directed by Peter Zadek
German black-and-white films
German films based on plays
Films set in Norway
Films set in the 1950s
Knut Hamsun
1970s German films